Hurricane is a nickname for:

 Rubin Carter (1937–2014), American boxer wrongly convicted of murder
 Para Draine (born 1972), American female boxer
 Bob Hannah (born 1956), American motorcycle racer
 Bob Hazle (1930–1992), American Major League Baseball player
 Alex Higgins (1949–2010), snooker player from Northern Ireland
 Shane Burgos (born 1991), UFC fighter

See also
 Duncan Hutchison (1904-1973), Scottish footballer nicknamed "Hurricane Hutch"
 Robert Skene (polo player) (1914-1997), polo player nicknamed "Hurricane Bob"
 Cyclone (nickname)

Lists of people by nickname
Nicknames in baseball
Nicknames in boxing
Nicknames in sports